Curium hydroxide [Cm(OH)3] is a radioactive compound first discovered in measurable quantities in 1947. It is composed of a single curium atom, and three hydroxide groups. It was the first curium compound ever isolated.

Curium hydroxide is anhydrous colorless or light yellow amorphous gelatinous solid that is insoluble to water. Due to self-irradiation the crystal structure of 244Cm(OH)3 decomposes within one day, while for americium(III) hydroxide 241Am(OH)3 the same process takes 4-6 months.

See also
Curium(III) oxide

References

Curium compounds
Hydroxides
Substances discovered in the 1940s